Do You Trust This Computer? is a 2018 American documentary film directed by Chris Paine that outlines the benefits and especially the dangers of artificial intelligence. It features interviews with a range of prominent individuals relevant to AI, such as Ray Kurzweil, Elon Musk, Michal Kosinski, and Jonathan Nolan. The film was directed by Chris Paine, known for Who Killed the Electric Car? (2006) and, the subsequent followup, i.e., Revenge of the Electric Car (2011).

Topics covered range from military drones to AI-powered "fake news" feeds. At one point while being interviewed, Musk warns that any human dictator will eventually die, but that a digital superintelligence could someday become an "immortal dictator from which we can never escape". Musk also sponsored free streaming of the film on Vimeo during the weekend of April 7, 2018. The film was featured at the 2018 Napa Film Festival.

The documentary is dedicated to Stephen Hawking, who warned that humanity may be jeopardized by its pursuit of a superintelligent AI.

See also
 Artificial Intelligence
 Ethics of artificial intelligence
 Lethal autonomous weapon
 AI takeover
 OpenAI

References

External links
 
 

2018 films
2018 documentary films
2018 independent films
Documentary films about computing
American documentary films
Documentary films about conspiracy theories
2010s English-language films
2010s American films